Bears, Mayors, Scraps & Bones is the third studio album by Canadian hardcore punk band Cancer Bats. In Canada, it was released on April 13, 2010 through Distort Entertainment. The name of the album derives from each of the members' personal nickname (Mike Peters – Bear; Scott Middleton – Mayor; Liam Cormier – Scraps; Jaye R. Schwarzer – Bones). The first single from the album was "Dead Wrong". A music video was previously made and released for "Sabotage" when it was released on the band's EP Sabotage. Pre-orders of the album included a limited bonus DVD consisting of 2 hours of live footage and the making of the album.

Track listing

Personnel

Cancer Bats
 Liam Cormier – lead vocals
 Scott Middleton – guitars, backing vocals
 Mike Peters – drums
 Jaye R. Schwarzer – bass, backing vocals (Track 4)

Additional personnel
 Eric Ratz – production, engineer, mixing
 Kenny Luong – production, engineer, mixing
 Andrew McCracken – album artwork and layout
 Scott Lake – mastering (at Metalworks Studios in Mississauga, Ontario)
 Dajaun Martineau – additional editing
 Chris Snow – assistant engineer

References

2010 albums
Cancer Bats albums
Hassle Records albums
Distort Entertainment albums